Gisela Birkemeyer (née Köhler on 22 December 1931) is a retired German sprint runner who won two medals in the 80 m hurdles at the 1956 and 1960 Olympics. During her career she set nine world records in the 80 m hurdles and in the 4×100 m, 4×110 yd and 4×200 m relays. She won 40 East German championships, mostly in the 80 m hurdles (1953–1961) and 200 m sprint (1956–1960). At the European Championships in Stockholm in 1958, she was third in the 80 m hurdles. In 1959, she was voted GDR Sportswoman of the Year.

Earlier in 1957 she married Heinz Birkemeyer and since 1960 competed under his name. After retiring from competitions she worked as a coach. She now lives as a pensioner in Berlin Marzahn.

References

External links
 

1931 births
Living people
German female hurdlers
Olympic silver medalists for the United Team of Germany
Olympic bronze medalists for the United Team of Germany
Olympic athletes of the United Team of Germany
Athletes (track and field) at the 1956 Summer Olympics
Athletes (track and field) at the 1960 Summer Olympics
European Athletics Championships medalists
Medalists at the 1960 Summer Olympics
Medalists at the 1956 Summer Olympics
Olympic silver medalists in athletics (track and field)
Olympic bronze medalists in athletics (track and field)